The Rosenberg Estate is a country estate in the  municipality of Hombrechtikon and the canton of Zurich in Switzerland. It is a Swiss heritage site of national significance.

References

External links
 

Buildings and structures in the canton of Zürich
Hombrechtikon
Villas in Switzerland
Cultural property of national significance in the canton of Zürich